Tarvasjoki is a former municipality in the region of Southwest Finland, in Finland. It was merged with the municipality of Lieto on 1 January 2015.

The municipality was unilingually Finnish.

Name
The  name part joki means "river". The Tarvas part of the name originally referred to wild animals that were hunted, for example aurochs (wild cattle) and roe deer.

Villages
Eura, Horrinen, Hungerla, Jauhola, Juva, Kallela, Karhula, Killala, Kirkonkylä, Kättylä, Liedonperä, Mäentaka, Satopää, Seppälä, Suitsula, Suurila, Takamaa, Tiensuu, Tuomarla, Tuorila, Tyllilä, Yrjönkylä.

Famous people from Tarvasjoki
Gustaf Mauritz Armfelt, (1757 in Juva, Tarvasjoki – 1814) a Finnish-Swedish-Russian courtier and diplomat.

References

External links
 
  

Tarvasjoki
Populated places established in 1869
Former municipalities of Finland
1869 establishments in the Russian Empire